Sydney Trains is a train operator of a commuter-based rail network centred on the metropolitan area of Sydney which comprises seven metropolitan lines. The entire length of railway in New South Wales is maintained by Transport for New South Wales which is a statutory authority of the Government of New South Wales. It was formed when CityRail was dissolved on 30 June 2013. The former CityRail network has over 2,060 km (1282 mi) of track. The Sydney Trains network extends up to Berowra, to the north, Richmond to the north-west, Emu Plains to the west, Waterfall to the south (with some peak hour services continuing to Helensburgh), and Macarthur to the south west.

Most of the Sydney Trains network runs on the surface of suburban areas while some recently constructed and inner city sections run underground. The network is served by a fleet of double-deck electric multiple units.

Stations

See also 
Railways in Sydney
List of closed Sydney railway stations
Proposed railways in Sydney
List of Sydney Metro railway stations
List of NSW TrainLink railway stations

Related 
Lists of railway stations
List of metro systems
List of suburban and commuter rail systems
List of Sydney suburbs
Public transport in Sydney
Railways in Sydney
Transport in Australia

References

External links 
Station facilities – Sydney Trains and NSW Trainlink

Railway stations
Sydney trains
Railway stations
Lists of commuter rail stations